Carlo Giuliani, Boy is a 2002 Italian documentary film directed by Francesca Comencini. It was screened out of competition at the 2002 Cannes Film Festival. It details the death of Carlo Giuliani, who was shot dead by a police officer during the demonstrations against the Group of Eight in 2001.

References

External links

2002 films
2002 documentary films
2000s Italian-language films
Italian documentary films
Documentary films about law enforcement
Films directed by Francesca Comencini
Films scored by Ennio Morricone
Films about anarchism
2000s Italian films